Etoumbi is a district in the Cuvette-Ouest Department of Republic of the Congo.

References 

Cuvette-Ouest Department
Districts of the Republic of the Congo